Skirt and Blouse voting is a term in the politics of Ghana where a voter chooses the presidential candidate of one party and a parliamentary candidate of another party on the same ballot. It is an alternative name for split-ticket voting.

Skirt and blouse voting can be seen as a form of protest against particular presidential or legislative candidates that are imposed upon voters by party elites or as a vote of no confidence in particular candidates. Certain experts also attribute the phenomenon to the increasing political consciousness of the nation's electorate.

The phenomenon of skirt and blouse voting has grown in recent years, with 11 constituencies voting skirt and blouse in 1996 compared to 26 constituencies voting skirt and blouse in 2012.

However, none of the 28 constituencies that voted skirt and blouse in 2016 were duplicates from 2012.

See also
Tactical voting

References

Voting
Elections in Ghana